Povla Frijsh (3 August 1881 – 10 July 1960) was a Danish classical soprano and voice teacher.

Life
Frijsh was born on the island of Ærø in Denmark in 1881. She studied with Ove Christensen in Denmark and Jean Périer in Paris.

She mainly sang in concerts and recitals; although she did make a few opera appearances at the Paris Opera and the Royal Danish Theatre. She toured with artists including Raoul Pugno, Pablo Casals, and Jacques Thibaud. She was a champion of contemporary classical music, and was an important exponent of the works of Virgil Thomson, Randall Thompson, Francis Poulenc, Rebecca Clarke, and Samuel Barber. After a 49-year-long performance career, she retired from singing in 1947. Her notable pupils included Adele Addison, Jean Kraft, and Cornelius L. Reid.

She died in Blue Hill, Maine, in 1960.

References

External links
 

1881 births
1960 deaths
Danish operatic sopranos
Voice teachers
20th-century Danish women opera singers
Women music educators
People from Ærø Municipality